The Director of the U.S. Immigration and Customs Enforcement (ICE) is a civilian official in the United States Department of Homeland Security. During July 2010 the position's title was changed from Assistant Secretary for U.S. Immigrations and Customs Enforcement.

The Director is in charge of the day-to-day operations of more than 7000 Homeland Security Investigations Agents (HSI) that are the primary investigative component of ICE and 6000 Enforcement and Removal Operations Officers (ERO). ICE is an agency with the United States Department of Homeland Security and the director reports to the United States Secretary of Homeland Security and the United States Deputy Secretary of Homeland Security.

This position requires Senate confirmation.

The current acting director is Tae Johnson who assumed the role following Jonathan Fahey's resignation on January 13, 2021 due to the 2021 storming of the United States Capitol.

Overview
The director of Immigration and Customs Enforcement is the chief administrator with enforcement of US immigration laws and criminal investigations of transnational criminal organizations. This mission is executed through the enforcement of more than 400 federal statutes and focuses on immigration enforcement, preventing terrorism and combating the illegal movement of people and goods.

Officeholders
†- Indicates title of office upon appointment was Assistant Secretary for U.S. Immigrations and Customs Enforcement

See also 

 Chief, IRS Criminal Investigation
 Director of the Central Intelligence Agency
 Director of the Federal Bureau of Investigation
 Director of the United States Marshals Service
 Director of the United States Secret Service
 Federal law enforcement in the United States

References

2003 establishments in the United States
 
United States Department of Homeland Security officials
U.S. Immigration and Customs Enforcement officials